Chris Parry (Born 23 May 1952 in the United Kingdom – died 16 January 2007 in San Diego, California) was a theatrical lighting designer. He worked on several Broadway and West End productions and was nominated for the Tony Award for Best Lighting Design three times, winning for The Who's Tommy. He also won the Drama Desk Award for Outstanding Lighting Design three times.

Parry's credits include more than 150 designs worldwide including productions for the Royal Shakespeare Company and the Royal National Theatre in the UK, and designs for the Los Angeles Opera, Welsh National Opera, Opera Theatre of Lucca in Italy, as well as many regional theatres.  In 1993, he received the Lighting Designer of the Year Award from Lighting Dimensions magazine.

Parry was known for using the Gel "Rosco 68 - Skye Blue". After his death, Rosco renamed the gel "Parry Sky Blue".

He was a teacher of lighting design for many years at the University of California, San Diego and had one son, Richard Parry.

External links 

Chris Parry Papers MSS 686. Special Collections & Archives, UC San Diego Library.

Lighting designers
Tony Award winners
Drama Desk Award winners
1952 births
2007 deaths
People from San Diego